Kathirunna Nikah is a 1965 Indian Malayalam-language film,  directed by M. Krishnan Nair and produced by M. Raju Mathan. The film stars Prem Nazir, Sheela, Adoor Bhasi and Thikkurissy Sukumaran Nair. The film had musical score by G. Devarajan.

Cast
Prem Nazir as Kabir
Sheela as Laila
 T. S. Muthaiah
Adoor Bhasi as Mammali
Thikkurissy Sukumaran Nair as Usman
Ambika as Vahida
Bahadoor as Abookar
Haji Abdul Rahman as Kabir's father
Meena as Fathima
S. P. Pillai as Moideen
Kottayam Chellappan as Layla's father
Nilambur Ayisha as Mammali's mother
Sarala as Madhavi

Soundtrack
The music was composed by G. Devarajan and the lyrics were written by Vayalar Ramavarma.

References

External links
 

1965 films
1960s Malayalam-language films
Films directed by M. Krishnan Nair